Ibrahim Karamoko (born 23 July 2001) is a French professional footballer who plays as midfielder for Guingamp II.

Career

Chievo
On 7 March 2019, Karamoko signed his first professional contract with Chievo. He made his professional debut for Chievo in a 1–1 Serie A tie with on 28 April 2019.

Torino
On 5 October 2020, Karamoko signed with Serie A club Torino a deal.

References

External links

Chievo Verona Profile
Lega Serie A Profile

2001 births
Living people
Association football midfielders
Footballers from Paris
French footballers
French sportspeople of Guinean descent
A.C. ChievoVerona players
Torino F.C. players
R.E. Virton players
Serie A players
Serie B players
Challenger Pro League players
Championnat National 2 players
French expatriate footballers
Expatriate footballers in Italy
French expatriate sportspeople in Italy
Expatriate footballers in Belgium
French expatriate sportspeople in Belgium
Black French sportspeople